The Flying House may refer to:

 The Flying House (1921 film), a 1921 animated film by Winsor McCay
 The Flying House (TV series), a 1982–1983 Japanese animated TV series